Meysam Joudaki (born May 5, 1995 in Iran) is an Iranian football defender, who currently plays for Gostaresh in Iran Pro League.

References

External links
 Meysam Joudaki at PersianLeague

Iranian footballers
1995 births
Living people
Esteghlal F.C. players
Naft Tehran F.C. players
Rah Ahan players
Gostaresh Foulad F.C. players
Association football defenders